Rosie Rowell (born 29 April 1965) is a British actress, probably best known for her roles as Eileen Callan in Family Affairs (a role she played from 2002 until the series ended in 2005) and Donna Tucker in Soldier Soldier. She has also had parts in several other well-known British TV series, including The Bill, Casualty and Where the Heart Is, as well as providing voice-over for documentaries and television commercials.

Early life
Rowell   grew up in Byker, a tough area of Newcastle. She attended Heaton Manor School. Her parents split up when she was young and at 16 she ran away to London, living in squats while attending the Royal Central School of Speech & Drama.

Filmography 

 Dispatches: Britain's Secret Slaves (2010) Narrator
 Dispatches: Undercover Social Worker (2010) Narrator
 The Bill (2008) Fiona Marlowe
 Casualty (2008, 2009) Julie Chantrey
 Dispatches: Undercover Mosque (2007) Narrator
 Doctors (2006) Jeannie Watts
 Family Affairs (2002–2005) Eileen Callan
 Where the Heart Is (2002) Evelyn Parrish
 Dalziel and Pascoe (2001) Sandra Pallister
 Gabriel & Me (2001) Mam
 Where There's Smoke (2001) Lucy
 Kid in the Corner (1999) Gillian Joyce
 Gold (1997) Maggie
 Kiss and Tell (1996) Jude Sawyer
 Soldier Soldier (1991–1995) Donna Tucker
 Come Snow, Come Blow (1993)
 South of the Border (1988–1990) Finn Gallagher

External links 

 
 Rosie Rowell at Holbytv

1965 births
Living people
British actresses